Highview may refer to a place in the United States:

Highview, Louisville, Kentucky
High View, West Virginia
Highview Power, company specialized in cryogenic energy storage.